Ithycythara lanceolata, common name the spear mangelia, is a species of sea snail, a marine gastropod mollusk in the family Mangeliidae.

Description
The length of the shell varies between 4 mm and 20 mm.

(Original description) The shell is very long and has a lanceolate shape. It is brownish, more or less tinged with purple, with fine spiral lines of white and of dark brown, which are more conspicuous on the ribs; with a darker and wider brown line along the suture. The longitudinal sculpture consists of six very prominent acute transverse ribs on each whorl, which are nearly or quite continuous on the successive whorls. There is a spiral elevated line, on the middle of the whorls, which is obsolete in the intercostal spaces and has nodtdous intersections with the ribs. The protoconch is acute. The spire shows rectilinear outlines. The shell contains 8 whorls, scarcely convex, with a lightly impressed suture. The outer lip is finely denticulate within. The sinus is shallow. The siphonal canal is not very short.

Distribution
I. lanceolata can be found in Atlantic waters, ranging from the eastern coast of Florida south to Brazil.; in the Caribbean Sea, the Gulf of Mexico and the Lesser Antilles.

Habitat
Depth range based on 5 specimens in 1 taxon.

Water temperature and chemistry ranges based on 1 sample.

Environmental ranges
  Depth range (m): 2.75 – 18
  Temperature range (°C): 23.720 – 23.720
  Nitrate (umol/L): 0.501 – 0.501
  Salinity (PPS): 36.080 – 36.080
  Oxygen (mL/L): 4.807 – 4.807
  Phosphate (umol/L): 0.100 – 0.100
  Silicate (umol/L): 0.805 – 0.805

References

 Paulmier G. (2019). Le genre Ithycythara (Conoidea, Mangeliinae) aux Antilles françaises. Description de 4 nouvelles espèces. Xenophora Taxonomy. 25: 3-10. page(s): 8, figs 24-27

External links
 Reeve L.A. (1846). Monograph of the genus Mangelia. In: Conchologia Iconica, or, illustrations of the shells of molluscous animals, vol. 3, pl. 1-8 and unpaginated text. L. Reeve & Co., London
 Rosenberg, G., F. Moretzsohn, and E. F. García. 2009. Gastropoda (Mollusca) of the Gulf of Mexico, Pp. 579–699 in Felder, D.L. and D.K. Camp (eds.), Gulf of Mexico–Origins, Waters, and Biota. Biodiversity. Texas A&M Press, College Station, Texas
  Tucker, J.K. 2004 Catalog of recent and fossil turrids (Mollusca: Gastropoda). Zootaxa 682:1–1295.
 
 Specimen at MNHN, Paris

lanceolata
Gastropods described in 1850